Volleyball was one of the many sports which was held at the 1974 Asian Games in Tehran, Iran. All matches played at the Volleyball Hall in Aryamehr Sport Complex.

Medalists

Medal table

Draw
The draw was held in Tehran. The men were drawn into two groups of four teams, the women were played in round robin format, six teams were registered but Khmer Republic later withdrew.

Group A

Group B

Results

Men

Preliminary round

Group A

Group B

Classification 5th–8th

Semifinals

7th place match

5th place match

Final round

Semifinals

Bronze medal match

Gold medal match

Final standing

Women

References
 Men's Results
 Women's Results

 
1974 Asian Games events
1974
Asian Games
International volleyball competitions hosted by Iran